The 1972 United States House of Representatives elections in Texas occurred on November 7, 1972, to elect the members of the state of Texas's delegation to the United States House of Representatives. Texas had twenty-four seats in the House, up one from the 1960s, apportioned according to the 1970 United States Census.

Texas Democrats maintained their governmental trifecta after the 1970 elections. This gave the Democrats full control over the redistricting process. The Texas Legislature enacted its redistricting plan in 1971. Residents of the 6th, 13th, 16th, and 19th congressional districts challenged the constitutionality of the maps in White v. Weiser, but the Supreme Court stayed the case until after the 1972 elections.

These elections occurred simultaneously with the United States Senate elections of 1972, the United States House elections in other states, the presidential election, and various state and local elections.

Democrats maintained their majority of U.S. House seats from Texas, but Republicans gained one seat, putting their majority at twenty out of twenty-four seats. This cycle saw the election of Barbara Jordan, the first African American elected to the House from Texas, and the first African American woman ever elected to the House.

Overview

Congressional Districts

See also 
 List of United States representatives from Texas
 United States House of Representatives elections, 1972

References

1972
Texas
1972 Texas elections